Milam is a census-designated place (CDP) in Sabine County, Texas, United States. It is located along the Sabine River at the junction of Highway 87 and Highway 21. The population was 1,355 at the 2020 census. Milam is the largest city in Sabine County.

Geography
Milam is located at  (31.453492, -93.785384).

Historical development
With an approximate settling date of 1828, it was originally dubbed Red Mound, but was renamed again in honor of Benjamin Rush Milam (a famous figure in the Texas Revolution) when it became the municipal seat of Sabine County in 1836. Because an increasing number of residents wanted a more central location for the county seat, in 1858 they designated the newly platted town of Hemphill, Texas to fill that role. During the Civil War, the Confederate Army Quartermaster for Sabine County served from Milam.

Demographics

As of the 2020 United States census, there were 1,355 people, 641 households, and 452 families residing in the CDP.

As of the census of 2000, there were 1,329 people, 608 households, and 424 families residing in the CDP. The population density was 40.5 people per square mile (15.6/km2). There were 1,010 housing units at an average density of 30.8/sq mi (11.9/km2). The racial makeup of the CDP was 90.90% White, 7.07% African American, 0.45% Native American, 0.38% Asian, 0.08% Pacific Islander, 0.30% from other races, and 0.83% from two or more races. Hispanic or Latino people of any race were 1.35% of the population.

There were 608 households, out of which 17.6% had children under the age of 18 living with them, 61.8% were married couples living together, 4.9% had a female householder with no husband present, and 30.1% were non-families. 28.0% of all households were made up of individuals, and 16.0% had someone living alone who was 65 years of age or older. The average household size was 2.19 and the average family size was 2.64.

In the CDP, the population was spread out, with 16.5% under the age of 18, 4.5% from 18 to 24, 17.4% from 25 to 44, 33.3% from 45 to 64, and 28.4% who were 65 years of age or older. The median age was 54 years. For every 100 females, there were 98.7 males. For every 100 females age 18 and over, there were 99.6 males.

The median income for a household in the CDP was $32,717, and the median income for a family was $38,077. Males had a median income of $27,159 versus $26,397 for females. The per capita income for the CDP was $20,155. About 6.4% of families and 10.8% of the population were below the poverty line, including 6.1% of those under age 18 and 11.9% of those age 65 or over.

Education
Milam is served by the Hemphill Independent School District.

Climate
The climate in this area is characterized by hot, humid summers and generally mild to cool winters.  According to the Köppen Climate Classification system, Milam has a humid subtropical climate, abbreviated "Cfa" on climate maps.

References

External links
 

Census-designated places in Sabine County, Texas
Census-designated places in Texas